Cary Brothers (born 1974) is an American indie rock singer-songwriter originally from Nashville, Tennessee, United States.  After moving to Los Angeles and becoming a regular performer at the influential Hotel Cafe venue, Brothers first gained national attention with his song "Blue Eyes" on the Platinum-selling, Grammy-winning "Garden State" soundtrack. As an independent artist, he has since toured worldwide, released two full-length records, and become one of the most-licensed artists in film and television. In the electronic dance music world, Brothers has collaborated with Tiësto on a club remix of his song "Ride" and an original song for Tiësto's album Kaleidoscope, and he co-wrote and sang the title tracks for the Cosmic Gate releases Wake Your Mind and Start to Feel.

History
With songs influenced by everything from 1980s British new wave music to 1970s folk music, Brothers achieved early critical and commercial success with his independent EPs All the Rage (2004) and Waiting for Your Letter (2005), both of which reached the top of the iTunes Singer-Songwriter charts.

While many artists focus their efforts on radio exposure, Brothers went a slightly different route and pushed to get songs out to the public through film and television shows as part of a generation of similar-minded indie artists in the United States.  Brothers' songs have appeared on the medical dramas Grey's Anatomy, Private Practice and ER, Scrubs, Cougar Town, the Fox mystery Bones, WB's Smallville, USA Network comedy Psych, ABC Family's show Kyle XY, One Tree Hill, Where We're Meant to Be, and the hit Emma Stone comedy Easy A. The original version of Brothers' song "Ride" appeared on the soundtrack to the feature film The Last Kiss alongside Coldplay and Ray Lamontagne. Brothers has also performed on The Late Late Show, Jimmy Kimmel Live! and Direct TV's CD USA. In 2005, he made a guest appearance with the London artist Aqualung on the Late Show with David Letterman and The Tonight Show with Jay Leno.

Brothers plays regularly as part of the musical community at the Hotel Café in Los Angeles, and he has since toured across America and Canada with such acts as Greg Laswell, Sara Bareilles, Liz Phair, KT Tunstall, Aqualung, Ben Lee, Matt Nathanson, Imogen Heap, and The Fray. In addition to his career as a musician, he co-created The Hotel Cafe Tour, which ran for 4 years in both the U.S. and Europe. Brothers also co-produced Joshua Radin's first EP and the song "Winter" from Radin's record We Were Here.

In 2007, Cary Brothers signed a record deal with indie label Bluhammock Music for the release of his first full-length album, Who You Are, on May 29, 2007, which made the Billboard Heatseekers Chart. Produced by Chad Fischer (Alexi Murdoch) and mixed by Greg Collins (Grammy Winner – U2), the record features guest musicians Matt Hales from Aqualung and Priscilla Ahn.  The video for the single "Ride" starring Brittany Snow was added to the rotation on VH1 in the U.S.  In addition, the record won "Best Rock Album of 2007" by the Indie Acoustic Project. Brothers' track 'Ride' has also been mixed by Tiësto and was a success on the dancefloors of Europe in 2008.  He helped close Friday night at Bonnaroo in the summer of 2008 by making a guest appearance with Tiësto and repeated this musical pairing a few months later at the O2 arena in London.

In 2009, Brothers went into the studio to work on his second full-length record. In addition, that year he had an original track called "Here on Earth" on the Tiësto record Kaleidescope alongside Sigur Rós, Tegan and Sara, Kele Okereke, Priscilla Ahn and Emily Haines.

Under Control was released on April 6, 2010, through Brothers' own Procrastination Music label and premiered at No. 1 on the iTunes Singer-Songwriter charts and No. 10 on the Billboard Heatseekers Chart.  Cary toured extensively in the United States in support of the record in 2010 and 2011 as both headliner and as an opening act for the Sara Bareilles tour. Staying active in social media, Brothers was named No. 14 on Paste Magazine's "50 Musicians Worth Following on Twitter" in August 2011.

In May 2012, Brothers released a DIY collection of five cover songs entitled Covers Volume One, featuring songs by Yeah Yeah Yeahs, David Bowie, Duran Duran, INXS, and Matt & Kim.  The EP also features guest vocals by Rachael Yamagata, Butterfly Boucher, and Priscilla Ahn.  It premiered in the Top Ten on the iTunes Singer-Songwriter Chart. In addition, Brothers released the EPs "Let Me Be" in 2014 and "Lovin' On You" in 2015.

After touring the US and Europe in 2015 and 2017, Brothers third full-length record "Bruises" was released on April 27, 2018. The single “Crush" went Top 5 on KCRW's influential Morning Becomes Eclectic radio show.

Personal life
Brothers attended Northwestern University.

Creative works

References

External links
Cary Brothers' official website
Cary Brothers' MySpace
Cary Brothers performing "The Last One" live at SXSW 2007
Cary Brothers on AbsolutePunk.net
LAist.com Interview with Cary Brothers
Cary Brothers live on WOXY.com, September 26, 2005

1974 births
Living people
American indie rock musicians
American male singer-songwriters
Singer-songwriters from California